Austin Island is one of several Canadian arctic islands in Nunavut, Canada within western Hudson Bay. The closest community is Arviat,  to the west.

References

Uninhabited islands of Kivalliq Region
Islands of Hudson Bay